Carlos Ávila (born 15 September 1951) is a Honduran long-distance runner. He competed in the marathon at the 1984 Summer Olympics.

References

1951 births
Living people
Athletes (track and field) at the 1984 Summer Olympics
Honduran male long-distance runners
Honduran male marathon runners
Olympic athletes of Honduras
Place of birth missing (living people)
Honduran male cross country runners